Nikolai Vasilyevich Tomsky ( b. , d. 22 November 1984) was a much-decorated Soviet sculptor, designer of many well-known ceremonial monuments of the Socialist Realism era.

Biography 

Born in the village of Staro Ramushevo in Novgorod province, into a blacksmith's family, Tomsky studied in Leningrad. In 1927, graduated from the Arts and Crafts College.

The sculptor first came to attention with his memorial to Sergey Kirov, a heroic bronze with friezes around the base, for which he won the 1941 Stalin Prize.  Thereafter his career developed in an official direction; he would be eventually tasked to re-design Lenin's own sarcophagus, produce Stalin's bust at Stalin's grave, and produce at least five major statues of Lenin throughout the Soviet Union.  His distinctive red-granite Lenin stood in the Leninplatz of East Berlin from 1970 to 1992.

Tomsky became a full member of the USSR Academy of Arts (1949, and president from 1968 to 1983), member of the Academy of Arts of the GDR, the Hero of Socialist Labor (1970), five Stalin Prize laureate (1941, 1947, 1949, 1950, 1952), the winner of the Lenin Prize (1972) and the USSR State Prize (1979), holder of three Orders of Lenin, the Order of the October Revolution, Order of the Red Banner and the Order of Karl Marx (GDR). He taught at MGAHIS (1948-1982), as Professor and as Rector of the Academy (1964-1970).

Work 

 monument to Sergey Kirov, Kirovskaya Square, St. Peterburg, 1937, with architect Noi Trotsky
 major frieze called Defense, Labor and Rest at the House of Soviets, St. Petersburg, 1936-1941, for architect Noi Trotsky
 Lenin, Varshavsky Rail Terminal, St. Petersburg, 1947, removed 2001
 bas-reliefs at the Novokuznetskaya Moscow metro station, 1943
 Victory Bridge, Moscow, with architect Dmitry Chechulin, 1943
 Stalin at the Kurskaya (Koltsevaya Line) Moscow metro station, 1950, removed 1961
 monument to Ivan Chernyakhovsky, Vilnius, 1950, relocated to Voronezh in 1993
 monument to Nikolai Gogol on Gogolevsky Boulevard, Moscow (replacing the controversial monument by sculptor Nikolay Andreyev), 1952
 bust of Stalin at his grave, Kremlin Wall Necropolis, 1953
 monument to Mikhail Lomonosov, Moscow University, 1954
 monument to Pavel Nakhimov, Sevastopol, 1959
 work at the Tomb of the Unknown Soldier (Moscow), 1967
 Lenin at Leninplatz, former East Berlin, 1970, removed and buried in 1992
 re-designed sarcophagus at Lenin's Tomb, Moscow, 1973
 equestrian statue of Field Marshal Kutuzov in the Kutuzovsky Prospekt, Moscow, 1973

References
 entry, St. Petersburg encyclopedia

1900 births
1984 deaths
People from Novgorod Oblast
Soviet sculptors
Russian male sculptors
Full Members of the USSR Academy of Arts
Stalin Prize winners
Heroes of Socialist Labour
20th-century sculptors